Polyommatus zarathustra, the Zarathustra blue, is a butterfly of the family Lycaenidae.

Subspecies
Monotypic

References

Butterflies described in 1997
Polyommatus
Butterflies of Asia